Waterloo Historic District, or variations, may refer to:

in the United States

Waterloo Historic District (Waterloo, Illinois), listed on the National Register of Historic Places (NRHP) in Monroe County
Waterloo Historic District (Warner, New Hampshire), NRHP-listed in Merrimack County
Waterloo Downtown Historic District (Waterloo, New York), listed on the NRHP in Seneca County
Waterloo Mills Historic District, Waterloo Mills, Pennsylvania, NRHP-listed
Waterloo Downtown Historic District (Waterloo, Wisconsin), NRHP-listed in Jefferson County

See also
Waterloo (disambiguation)